Nancy Stetson was the United States Special Representative for Global Food Security, responsible for leading all aspects of U.S. diplomacy related to food security and nutrition, appointed by U.S. Secretary of State John Kerry on June 23, 2014.  She is also the Deputy Coordinator for Diplomacy for Feed the Future - the US government's global hunger and food security initiative.  In October 2016, Ambassador Stetson was the deputy head of delegation for the U.S. party to Habitat III - the United Nations Conference on Housing and Sustainable Urban Development.

Biography
Stetson graduated with a baccalaureate degree in political science from Wellesley College, and she earned her Ph.D. from Columbia University in political science.  For more than 25 years she served on the staff of the United States Senate Committee on Foreign Relations as well as in the role of Senior Foreign Policy Advisor to then-Senator John Kerry.  In these roles, she contributed to the South Africa sanctions bill, normalization of relations between the United States and Vietnam, and funding for HIV/AIDS relief.

In her role as the United States Special Representative for Global Food Security, Stetson emphasized the importance of partnerships to address malnutrition, addressing food security through Feed the Future is a moral imperative, and addressing food security requires a recognition of a balance among disaster-response operations and longer-term humanitarian assistance operations.

Stetson headed the U.S. Delegation to the 41st session of the Committee on World Food Security and the 42nd session of the Committee on World Food Security where she introduced the Caribbean Ocean Assets Sustainability faciliTy (COAST).

She was part of Secretary Kerry's delegation to the USA Pavilion at the Expo 2015.

Stetson was deputy head of the U.S. Delegation to the United Nations Habitat III conference on housing and sustainable urbanization in October, 2016.

References

External links
Office of Global Food Security
2015: The year of opportunity for nutrition. UN Standing Committee on Nutrition News
Dialogues on Nutrition. Communication to Inspire Change: US. UN FAO
A Transatlantic Policy Conversation on Global Food Security. Center for American Progress
The National Security Implications of Climate Change and Food Security. Center for American Progress

Year of birth missing (living people)
Living people
Wellesley College alumni
Columbia University alumni
United States Special Envoys
American women ambassadors
21st-century American women